Meridiano (in English, meridian) may refer to 

 Meridiano, São Paulo
 Diario Meridiano, a Venezuelan sports newspaper
 Meridiano Televisión, a Venezuelan sports network
 Meridiano de Córdoba, a Colombian newspaper